The Next Step is the 59th and final studio album by American musician James Brown. The album was released on August 27, 2002, by Fome Records.

"The following year he was the subject of a PBS American Masters documentary, James Brown: Soul Survivor. He continued performing well into the first decade of the 2000s, appearing at the second Bonnaroo festival in 2003, at the Edinburgh Live 8 concert in 2005, and setting out on his "Seven Decades Of Funk World Tour" in 2006."

Brown died of congestive heart failure due to complications from pneumonia on December 25, 2006, four years after The Next Step was released.

Track listings
All tracks composed by James Brown and Derrick Monk; except where indicated

References

James Brown albums
2002 albums
Albums produced by James Brown